RTI-83 ((–)-2β-carbomethoxy-3β-(4-ethylphenyl)tropane) is a phenyltropane derivative which represents a rare example of an SDRI or serotonin-dopamine reuptake inhibitor, a drug which inhibits the reuptake of the neurotransmitters serotonin and dopamine, while having little or no effect on the reuptake of the related neurotransmitter noradrenaline. With a binding affinity (Ki) of 55 nM at DAT and 28.4 nM at SERT but only 4030 nM at NET, RTI-83 has reasonable selectivity for DAT/SERT over NET

However, further research has shown that by extending the ethyl chain even better selectivity can be achieved, with the 4′-(cis-propenyl) analogue having Ki values of 15 nM at DAT and 7.1 nM at SERT, vs 2800 nM at NET. However RTI-436 has an even better selectivity for DAT over NET (3.09nM @ DAT & 1,960nM @ NET or a NET/DAT ratio of 634.3, but with lesser DAT/SERT equivalent potency with a ratio between them of 108) and RTI-88 has a still better ratio (984 NET/DAT with additionally having less selectivity than the former compound between DAT/SERT and having a more even spread of potency with the ratio between DAT & SERT being 88)

Such drugs are speculated to be useful as potential antidepressants, but few examples have been reported in the literature as yet. However, while RTI-83 has been used for binding studies to model the monoamine transporter proteins, its pharmacology in vivo has not been studied in detail.

See also 
 4-Ethylamphetamine
 4-Ethylmethcathinone
 UWA-101

References

External links 
 

Tropanes
RTI compounds
Serotonin–dopamine reuptake inhibitors
Sympathomimetic amines